The San Jose Stealth are a lacrosse team based in San Jose, California. The team plays in the National Lacrosse League (NLL). The 2009 season will be the 10th in franchise history and 6th as the Stealth (previously the Albany Attack).

On March 19, offensive coordinator Chris Hall was named head coach, while former head coach Jeff Dowling took over Hall's post as offensive coordinator. Dowling resigned a week later.

Regular season

Conference standings

Game log
Reference:

Playoffs

Game log
Reference:

Player stats
Reference:

Runners (Top 10)

Note: GP = Games played; G = Goals; A = Assists; Pts = Points; LB = Loose balls; PIM = Penalty minutes

Goaltenders
Note: GP = Games played; MIN = Minutes; W = Wins; L = Losses; GA = Goals against; Sv% = Save percentage; GAA = Goals against average

Transactions

New players
 Matt Roik - acquired in trade
 Peter Veltman - acquired in trade
 Travis Gillespie - acquired in trade
 Tom Johnson - acquired in trade

Players not returning
 Luke Wiles - traded
 Anthony Cosmo - traded
 Gary Rosyski - free agent
 Paul Dawson - traded
 Sean Morris - traded
 Steve Panarelli - traded
 Andrew Guindon - released

Trades

Entry draft
The 2008 NLL Entry Draft took place on September 7, 2008. The Stealth selected the following players:

Roster

See also
2009 NLL season

References

San Jose
San Jose Stealth